Joshua ben Isaac Bank was a Hebrew writer and rabbi at Tulchin, Polodia, born in Satanov in the first half of the nineteenth century.

Bibliography
Bank was the author of the following works:

 Avshalom ('The Downfall of Absalom'; Odessa, 1868), a tragedy in verse, with a supplement containing a selection of tales, legends, and epigrams;
 Sipurim nifla'im ('Wonderful Tales'; Odessa, 1870), translations from other languages into Hebrew verse; and
 Rosh millin ('Beginning of Words'; Zhitomir, 1872), a concise Hebrew-Yiddish dictionary.

References
 

19th-century births
19th-century Jews from the Russian Empire
19th-century writers from the Russian Empire
19th-century Ukrainian writers
Jewish Ukrainian writers
Jewish writers from the Russian Empire
People from Bratslavsky Uyezd
People from Tulchyn
Rabbis from the Russian Empire
Ukrainian rabbis